This is a list of 450 genera in the family Anthribidae, fungus weevils.

Anthribidae genera

 Acanthopygus  c g
 Acanthothorax  c g
 Acarodes  c g
 Acaromimus Jordan, 1907 i c g b
 Achoragus  c g
 Acorynus  c g
 Adapterops Frieser, 2010 g
 Adoxastia  c g
 Aethessa  c g
 Afrocedus  c g
 Afrophaenotherium  c g
 Allandrus LeConte, 1876 i c g b
 Allochoragus  c g
 Allochromicis  c g
 Alloderes  c g
 Alloplius  c g
 Alloschema
 Alticopus  c g
 Altipectus  c g
 Ambonoderes
 Amecus
 Anacerastes  c g
 Analotes  c g
 Anaulodes  c g
 Ancylotropis  c g
 Androceras  c g
 Androporus Holloway, 1982 g
 Aneurhinus  c g
 Aneurrhinus  c g
 Anhelita  c g
 Anthiera  c g
 Anthrenosoma  c g
 Anthribidus  c g
 Anthribisomus  c g
 Anthribites  c g
 Anthribulus  c g
 Anthribus Geoffroy, 1762 i c g b
 Anthrimecus  c g
 Antioxenus  c g
 Antribisomus  c g
 Apatenia  c g
 Aphaulimia  c g
 Apinotropis  c g
 Apolecta  c g
 Apolectella  c g
 Apteroxenus  c g
 Arachnocaulus  c g
 Araecerus Schoenherr, 1823 i c g b
 Araeocerodes  c g
 Araeocerus  c g
 Araeocorynus  c g
 Araeoderes Schaeffer, 1906 i c g b
 Aranthribus Kuschel, 1998 g
 Arecopais  c g
 Asemorhinus  c g
 Astianus  c g
 Atinella  c g
 Atinellia  c g
 Atophoderes  c g
 Atoporhis  c g
 Atropideres  c g
 Aulodina  c g
 Aurigeripilus Mermudes g
 Autotropis  c g
 Balanodes  c g
 Barra  c g
 Barridia  c g
 Basarukinia  c g
 Baseocolpus  c g
 Basidissus  c g
 Basitropis  c g
 Batyrhinius  c g
 Blaberops  c g
 Blabirhinus  c
 Bothrus  c g
 Botriessa  c g
 Brachetrus  c g
 Brachycorynus Valentine, 1998 i g b
 Brachylaenus  c g
 Brachytarsoides  c g
 Brachytarsus  c g
 Branconymus  c g
 Brevibarra  c g
 Breviurodon  c g
 Bruchela  c g
 Bruchella  c g
 Bythoprotus  c g
 Caccorhinus  c g
 Cacephatus  c g
 Caenophloeobius  c g
 Caliobius Holloway, 1982 g
 Callanthribus  c g
 Camaroderes  c g
 Cappadox  c g
 Caranistes  c g
 Catephina  c g
 Cedocus  c g
 Cedus  c g
 Cenchromorphus  c g
 Cerambyrhynchus  c g
 Cercomorphus  c g
 Cercotaphius  c g
 Cerius Holloway, 1982 g
 Chirotenon  c g
 Choragus Kirby, 1819 i c g b
 Cisanthribus  c g
 Citacalus  c g
 Cleorisintor  c g
 Cleranthribus  c g
 Commista  c g
 Conauchenus  c g
 Contexta  c g
 Cornipila  c g
 Corrhecerus  c g
 Corynaecia  c g
 Cratoparis  c g
 Cretanthribus Legalov, 2009 g
 Cretochoragus Soriano, Gratshev & Delclòs, 2006 g
 Cybosoma  c g
 Cylindroides  c g
 Cyptoxenus Valentine, 1982 g
 Dasyanthribus Holloway, 1982 g
 Dasycorynus  c g
 Dasyrhopala  c g
 Decataphanes  c g
 Dendropemon  c g
 Dendrotrogus  c g
 Derisemias  c g
 Derographium  c g
 Deropygus  c g
 Deuterocrates  c g
 Diastatotropis Lacordaire, 1866 g
 Dinema Fairmaire, 1849 i c g
 Dinephrius  c g
 Dinocentrus  c g
 Dinomelaena  c g
 Dinosaphis  c g
 Directarius  c g
 Discotenes Labram & Imhoff, 1839 i c g b
 Disphaerona  c g
 Disphaeronella  c g
 Dissoleucas  c g
 Doeothena  c g
 Dolichocera  c g
 Domoptolis  c g
 Doticus  c g
 Dysnocryptus  c g
 Dysnos  c g
 Ecelonerus  c g
 Echotropis  c g
 Ecprepia  c g
 Ectatotarsus  c g
 Eczesaris
 Electranthribus Legalov, 2013 g
 Enedreutes  c g
 Enedreytes  c g
 Ennadius
 Enspondus  c g
 Entaphioides  c g
 Entromus  c g
 Eothaumas  c g
 Epargemus  c g
 Epicerastes  c g
 Epidysnos  c g
 Epiplaterus  c g
 Epitaphius  c g
 Erichsonocis  c g
 Erotylopsis  c g
 Esocus  c g
 Ethneca
 Etnalidius Kuschel, 1998 g
 Etnalis  c g
 Euciodes  c g
 Eucloeus  c g
 Eucorynus  c g
 Eucyclotropis  c g
 Eugigas  c g
 Eugonissus  c g
 Eugonodes  c g
 Eugonops  c g
 Eugonus Schoenherr, 1833 i c g b
 Eupanteos  c g
 Euparius Schoenherr, 1823 i c g b  (fungus weevils)
 Euphloeobius  c g
 Eurometopus  c g
 Eurymycter LeConte, 1876 i c g b
 Euscelus
 Eusintor  c g
 Eusphyrus LeConte, 1876 i c g b
 Euxenulus Valentine, 1960 i c g b
 Euxenus LeConte, 1876 i c g b
 Euxuthus  c g
 Exechesops  c g
 Exechontis  c g
 Exilis  c g
 Exillis Pascoe, 1860 i c g
 Exurodon  c g
 Garyus  c g
 Genethila  c g
 Gibber  c g
 Glaesotropis Gratshev & Zherikhin, 1995 g
 Gnathoxena  c g
 Gnoticarina  c g
 Gomphides  c g
 Gomyaccudus Frieser, 1980 g
 Goniocloeus Jordan, 1904 i c g b
 Gonops  c g
 Gonotropis LeConte, 1876 i c g b
 Griburiosoma  c g
 Gulamentus  c g
 Gymnognathus Schoenherr, 1826 i c g b
 Gynandrocerus  c g
 Habrissus  c g
 Habroxenus Valentine, 1998 i g b
 Hadromerina  c g
 Haplopygus Kuschel, 1998 g
 Helmoreus Holloway, 1982 g
 Heniocera  c g
 Hiera  c g
 Holophloeus  c g
 Holostilpna  c g
 Homalorhamphus  c g
 Homocloeus  c g
 Homoeodera  c g
 Homoeotropis  c g
 Hoplorhaphus Holloway, 1982 g
 Hormiscops  c g
 Howeanthribus  c g
 Hucus  c g
 Hybosternus  c g
 Hylopemon  c g
 Hylotribus  c g
 Hypselotropis  c g
 Hypseus  c g
 Icospermus  c g
 Idiopus
 Illis  c g
 Indotaphius  c g
 Isanthribus Holloway, 1982 g
 Ischnocerus Schoenherr, 1839 i c g b
 Japanthribus  c g
 Jordanthribus  c g
 Lagopezus  c g
 Lawsonia Sharp, 1873 g
 Lemuricedus  c g
 Leptonemus  c g
 Lichenobius  c g
 Limiophaula  c g
 Litocerus  c g
 Litotropis  c g
 Macrocephalus Luo & Hu, 1999 c g
 Macrotrichius  c g
 Mallorrhynchus  c g
 Mauia Blackburn, 1885 i c g
 Mecocerina  c g
 Mecocerinopis  c g
 Mecocerus  c g
 Meconemus  c g
 Mecotarsus  c g
 Mecotropis  c g
 Meganthribus  c g
 Megatermis  c g
 Megax  c g
 Melanopsacus  c g
 Mentanus  c g
 Merarius  c g
 Meriolus  c g
 Mesidiotropis  c g
 Mesocranius Kuschel, 1998 g
 Messalius  c g
 Mionus Kuschel, 1998 g
 Misthosima  c g
 Misthosimella  c g
 Monocloeus  c g
 Monosirhapis  c g
 Morphocera  c g
 Mucronianus  c g
 Mycteis  c g
 Mylascopus  c g
 Nausicus  c g
 Neanthribus  c g
 Nemotrichus  c g
 Neoxenus Valentine, 1998 i g b
 Nerthomma  c g
 Neseonos  c g
 Nesidobius  c g
 Nessia  c
 Nessiabrissus  c g
 Nessiara  c g
 Nessiaropsis  c g
 Nessiodocus  c g
 Nistacares  c g
 Notiana  c g
 Notioxenus  c g
 Notochoragus  c g
 Notoecia  c g
 Noxius  c g
 Opanthribus  c g
 Opisolia  c g
 Ormiscus G. R. Waterhouse, 1845 i c g b
 Orthotropis  c g
 Oxyconus  c g
 Oxyderes  c g
 Ozotomerus  c g
 Pachygenia  c g
 Paecilocaulus  c g
 Palazia  c g
 Panastius  c g
 Pantorhaenas  c g
 Papuatorhaenas  c g
 Parablops
 Paramesus  c g
 Paranthribus  c g
 Paraphloeobius  c g
 Parexillis  c g
 Paropus  c g
 Peltorrhinus  c g
 Penestica  c g
 Peribathys  c g
 Perichoragus  c g
 Perroudius Holloway, 1982 g
 Phaenithon Schönherr, 1826 c g b
 Phaeniton Schoenherr, 1823 i
 Phaenotheriolum  c g
 Phaenotherion  c g
 Phaenotheriopsis  c g
 Phaenotheriosoma  c g
 Phaenotherium  c g
 Phaeochrotes  c g
 Phanosolena  c g
 Phaulimia  c g
 Phides  c g
 Phloeobiopsis  c g
 Phloeobius Schoenherr, 1823 i c g
 Phloeomimus  c g
 Phloeopemon  c g
 Phloeophilus  c g
 Phloeops  c g
 Phloeotragus  c g
 Phoenicobiella Cockerell, 1906 i c g b
 Phoenicobius  c g
 Phrynoidius  c g
 Physopterus  c g
 Piesocorynus Dejean, 1834 i g b
 Piezobarra  c g
 Piezocorynus  c g
 Piezonemus  c g
 Pilitrogus  c g
 Pioenia  c g
 Pioenidia  c g
 Pistorhinus Kuschel, 1998 g
 Platyrhinus Clairville, 1798 c
 Platystomos  c g
 Platystomus  c g
 Plesiobasis  c g
 Plintheria  c g
 Polycorynus  c g
 Proscoporhinus  c g
 Proscoporrhinus  c g
 Proscopus
 Protaedus  c g
 Protomerus  c
 †Protoscelis Medvdev, 1968
 Prototropis  c g
 Pseudeuparius  c g
 Pseudobasidissus  c g
 Pseudocedus  c g
 Pseudochoragus Petri, 1912 i c g b
 Pseudomecorhis  c g
 Ptychoderes  c g
 Raphitropis  c g
 Rawasia  c g
 Rhaphidotropis  c g
 Rhaphitropis  c g
 Rhinanthribus  c g
 Rhinobrachys  c g
 Rhinotropis  c g
 Rhynapion  c g
 Saperdirhynchus Scudder, 1893 g
 Schimatocheilus  c g
 Scirtetinus  c g
 Scymnopis  c g
 Sharpius Holloway, 1982 g
 Sicanthus Valentine, 1998 i g b
 Sintor  c g
 Sintorops  c g
 Solox Kuschel, 1998 g
 Sophronus Kuschel, 1998 g
 Spatorrhamphus  c g
 Sphinctotropis  c g
 Stenocerus Schoenherr, 1826 i c g b
 Stenorhis  c g
 Stenorhynchus Lamarck, 1818 i c g
 Sternocyphus  c g
 Stiboderes  c g
 Strabops  c g
 Straboscopus  c g
 Streneoderma  c g
 Styphlochoragus  c g
 Sympaector  c g
 Synchoragus  c g
 Syntophoderes  c g
 Systaltocerus  c g
 Taburnus  c g
 Talpella  c g
 Taphrodes  c g
 Tapinidius  c g
 Telala  c g
 Telphes  c g
 Teratanthribus  c g
 Tetragonopterus
 Tophoderellus  c g
 Tophoderes  c g
 Toxonotus Lacordaire, 1866 i c g b
 Toxotropis  c g
 Trachitropis  b
 Trachycyphus  c g
 Trachytropis Jordan, 1904 i c g
 Tribasileus Holloway, 1982 g
 Tribotropis  c g
 Trigonorhinus Wollaston, 1861 i c g b
 Trigonorrhinus  c g
 Triplodus  c g
 Tropideres  c g
 Tropiderinus  c g
 Tropidivisus  c g
 Tropidobasis  c g
 Ulorhinus  c g
 Uncifer  c g
 Urodon  c g
 Urodontus Louw, 1993 i
 Uterosomus  c g
 Valenfriesia Alonso-Zarazaga & Lyal, 1999 g
 Vitalis
 Xanthoderopygus Senoh, 1984 g
 Xenanthribus  c g
 Xenocerus  c g
 Xenognathus  c
 Xenopternis  c g
 Xenorchestes  c g
 Xenotropis  c g
 Xylinada  c g
 Xylinades  c g
 Xylopoemon  c g
 Xynotropis  c g
 Xynotrupis  c g
 Zopyrinus  c g
 Zygaenodes  c g

Data sources: i = ITIS, c = Catalogue of Life, g = GBIF, b = Bugguide.net

References

Lists of insect genera